The 2021–22 Qatar Women's Football League, was the X edition of top-level women's football championship in Qatar. The league kicked off on 27 December 2021 and ended on 27 March 2022.
Al-Khor won the league. All matches were played at Qatar Women's sports committee stadium

Teams

Personnel and kits

League Tabel

Matches

See also
 2020–21 Qatar Stars League

References

External links 
 Qatar Football Association

W1
Qatar Women's Football League